Bandar Lengeh County is in Hormozgan province, Iran. The capital of the county is the city of Bandar Lengeh. At the 2006 census, the county's population was 113,625 in 24,712 households. The following census in 2011 counted 134,713 people in 32,981 households. At the 2016 census, the county's population was 159,358 in 44,398 households.

Administrative divisions

The population history and structural changes of Bandar Lengeh County's administrative divisions over three consecutive censuses are shown in the following table. The latest census shows four districts, eight rural districts, and five cities.

References

 

Counties of Hormozgan Province